Churchlands is a suburb of Perth, Western Australia approximately 8 km north-west of the central business district; it lies within the local government area of the City of Stirling. Churchlands is an expensive suburb with most homes built after the 1980s. Its post code is 6018.

History
This suburb became known as "Churchlands" after being purchased by the Roman Catholic Church in 1891 from the Trigg family.

Education and sporting facilities
Schools in the area include Churchlands Primary School, Churchlands Senior High School, Hale School and Newman College.

Newman College has its years 3 to 6 and years 7 to 12 located in two campuses in Churchlands.

Subiaco Marist Cricket Club is headquartered at Newman college.

Edith Cowan
It was formerly home to the Churchlands campus of Edith Cowan University, which closed in 2008.

The campus had been the Churchlands Teachers College (1972-1981) and the Churchlands campus of the Western Australian College of Advanced Education (1982-1990) prior to the founding of Edith Cowan University in 1991, and was the location of the university's headquarters until 2003.

The site was subsequently redeveloped as the Churchlands Green housing estate, while a small section of the site, including the campus amphitheatre, was set aside as Edith Cowan Reserve, serving as a memorial to the former campus.

Geography
On the eastern border of Churchlands is the large  Herdsman Lake, which is populated by many bird, amphibian and freshwater fish species. Picnic and bird-watching areas are accessible from the suburb.

See also
 Local government areas of Western Australia
 List of Perth suburbs
 List of postal codes in Australia

References

Suburbs of Perth, Western Australia
Suburbs in the City of Stirling